Albert Richard Mohr (1911–1992) was a German music and theatre expert.

He was born in Frankfurt. He studied there at the Frankfurt University.

From 1937 to 1943 he was lecturer on Music and Theatre History at the Hochschule für Musik und Darstellende Kunst Frankfurt am Main.

From 1938, he was actively engaged in the Oper Frankfurt.

Bibliography
 Albert Richard Mohr: Das Frankfurter Opernhaus 1880–1980. Kramer, Frankfurt am Main 1980,

References
 Biography, under Mohr Albert

External links
Albert Richard Mohr collection at Southern Illinois University Edwardsville
Listing in the University of Frankfurt Collections

1911 births
1992 deaths
20th-century German musicologists
Commanders Crosses of the Order of Merit of the Federal Republic of Germany